Guy Smith (August 7, 1892 – November 24, 1951) was a Canadian professional ice hockey player. He played with the Toronto Ontarios of the National Hockey Association.

He was a younger brother of ice hockey player Don Smith.

References

1892 births
1951 deaths
Canadian ice hockey left wingers
Sportspeople from Cornwall, Ontario
Toronto Ontarios players